The Jonassen Rocks are a small group of rocks lying off the south coast of South Georgia,  west of the south end of Novosilski Bay. They were surveyed by the South Georgia Survey in the period 1951–57, and named by the UK Antarctic Place-Names Committee for Idar Jonassen (1889–1933), a gunner of the Compañía Argentina de Pesca, Grytviken, 1924–33.

References

Rock formations of Antarctica